The Hungarian Athletics Championships are an annual outdoor track and field competition organized and supervised by the Hungarian Athletics Association, which serves as the Hungarian national championships for the sport.

History
The history of competitive athletics in Hungary dates back to 1875, when the Magyar Athletikai Club (MAC) was founded and organized the first public athletics event in the country. MAC continued to hold compeititons in the next decades, and with the growing popularity of the sport they were joined by newly founded clubs which had their own contests and gave out the Hungarian champion title. These, however, were not officially recognized national championships yet and the rules were also not standardized.

The turning point came in 1896, when Hungary celebrated its millennium and as part of the Millenary Feast sports events of great dimensions were held in Budapest in the presence of Emperor Franz Joseph I, attracting over 5,000 athletes. The competition turned out to be a complete success, which gave a big boost to the athletics. A year later, on 21 March 1897 the Hungarian Athletics Association (HAA) was created and two races of the 1896 championship – the 100 yard and the 1 mile event – were approved as official competitions, making Alajos Szokolyi and František Horn the first Hungarian Athletics Championships winners, respectively. Adding long jump and shot put in 1897, and 120 yard hurdles and 440 yard in 1901 to the events' list, MAC continued to organize the championships until 1903, subsequently taken over by the HAA.

Events

Men
 100 m
 200 m
 400 m
 800 m
 1500 m
 5000 m
 10000 m
 110 m hurdles
 400 m hurdles
 3000 m steeplechase
 4 × 100 m relay
 4 × 400 m relay
 High jump
 Pole vault
 Long jump
 Triple jump
 Shot put
 Discus throw
 Hammer throw
 Javelin throw

Women
 100 m
 200 m
 400 m
 800 m
 1500 m
 5000 m
 10000 m
 100 m hurdles
 400 m hurdles
 3000 m steeplechase
 4 × 100 m relay
 4 × 400 m relay
 High jump
 Pole vault
 Long jump
 Triple jump
 Shot put
 Discus throw
 Hammer throw
 Javelin throw

Venues

Championships records

Women

See also
Hungarian Athletics Association
Lists of Hungarian Athletics Championships champions

References

External links
Official website of the Hungarian Athletics Association (in Hungarian)
List of Hungarian Athletics Championships winners (men) (in Hungarian)
List of Hungarian Athletics Championships winners (women) (in Hungarian)

 
Recurring sporting events established in 1896
1896 establishments in Hungary
National athletics competitions